Gransmore Green is a hamlet in the civil parish of Felsted, in the Uttlesford district of  Essex, England. Nearby settlements include the  towns of Braintree and Great Dunmow, and Felsted village. The hamlet is situated on the B1417 road, with the A120 road nearby to the north.

References 
A-Z Essex (page 13)

Hamlets in Essex
Felsted